Heikki Jalmari Mäkinen (12 June 1888 – 11 December 1960) was a Finnish house painter and politician, born in Tyrväntö. He was a Member of the Parliament of Finland from 1922 to 1924, representing the Socialist Workers' Party of Finland (SSTP).

References

1888 births
1960 deaths
People from Hattula
People from Häme Province (Grand Duchy of Finland)
Socialist Workers Party of Finland politicians
Members of the Parliament of Finland (1922–24)